Dave U. Hall (born R.U.Hall?, in New York City) is an American musician whose musical voice is articulated by the tones of his Electric Bass guitar. He was a member of the band Birdland with Lester Bangs (Bangs, who is often cited today as "America's Greatest Rock Critic," was editor for Creem magazine, musician and staff writer for the Village Voice. His character was played in the movie "Almost Famous") and The Rattlers (in which Hall played on their acclaimed Rattled album and CD). He has also played with other bands (and artists) including, but not limited too, Zymosis, The Makers, Luigi & the Wiseguys, Danny Russo Blues Band (Muddy Waters, Willie Dixon, Victoria Spivey, Spivey Records), Remod (with Richie Ramone), Jeff Salen (Tuff Darts, Sparks (band)), Tiger Beats, Tina Peel, Alan Merrill author of the song "I Love Rock 'n' Roll", Joey Ramone, Saturday Night and Sunday Morning. By the end of the punk era, Hall had a reputation for being a session and performance player for many bands.

Biography
Dave U. Hall's formal music training began during his Forest Hills High School years. While attending school and playing concerts (in addition to playing along to his numerous album collection), Hall studied Upright Bass, Electric Bass and Flute with famous studio musicians in the New York City area. He studied flute with Seymour "Red" Press (Music Coordinator for numerous NYC Broadway shows) . His bass teachers include Rick Laird (from the Mahavishnu Orchestra), Clyde Lombardi (CBS Studio Musician), Richard Davis (double bassist) (International Performing Musician) and Jay Leonhart (Sting and Frank Sinatra).

After graduating from High School, Hall was accepted into Boston's prestigious Berklee College of Music. Because of his ability to read music so well, he was placed in advanced sight-reading ensemble labs. Hall also studied bass privately at Berklee with Richard Appleman (Chairman) and Steve Swallow (Gary Burton Band with Pat Metheny, John Scofield Trio). Because of Swallow's intense performing schedule with the Gary Burton Group, Hall was given Swallow's bass classes to teach when Steve had band/teaching conflicts.

Hall went on from Berklee to play with the jazz/rock group Zymosis. The band played the New York City club circuit (which included Max's Kansas City and CBGB's). Because of their gig affiliation with Max's, the band was included in the Max's Kansas City Book entitled, "Art, Glamour, Rock and Roll". They were also written up in the British magazine publication "Melody Maker" by reviewer Steve Lake. Lake proudly dubbed the group the "punk jazz" band of that time.

After leaving the band, Hall studied (and received a degree in) music education at Queens College. During this time, Hall was so intrigued by the punk rock scene, that he somehow wanted to infuse his classical/jazz background into punk music. Hall started playing with many Punk Rock bands which eventually led him joining Birdland with Lester Bangs. However, after leaving Birdland to focus on his studies, Hall forged on and continued playing the circuit with other well known punk bands in the New York City area. Hall used this opportunity as a learning tool to incorporate his talent into a multitude of different styles and genres. Soon thereafter, Hall joined The Rattlers. Hall toured with them and played on their "Rattled" album. Hall co-wrote the song entitled "I Won't Be Your Victim" that eventually was picked as a single, and for which a video was shot. "Rattled" was well received and highly acclaimed by the industry including writers such as Robert Christgau (writer from the Village Voice).

His solo CD has been played on radio stations like Sirius Radio's Little Steven's Underground Garages' Goldie's Garage show featuring Genya Ravan, WPKN's "Chris Frantz The Talking Head" show featuring Chris Frantz (Tom Tom Club) and Vorterix Radio to name a few (as well as streaming stations like ITunes, youTube Google Music and Spotify).

Seeing the limitations of individual artistic development in The Rattlers, Hall decided to leave the group to concentrate on his songwriting. Thus began the project known as the Walter MIDI Group. The idea eventually led to a conceptual band. Since its inception over the years however, it has culminated into Hall's first solo CD entitled Walter MIDI Group "AND THEN YOU WOKE UP!" The CD is an autobiographical account of his life's experience.

In 2014, Hall played on the Jiro Okabe Kamikazi CD. Players on that CD included, Clem Burke of Blondie band, Elliot Easton formally of The Cars, C.J. Ramone formally of the Ramones and many others.

Hall also spends his time teaching music in the New York City public schools. He is an Apple Computer consultant whose clients included the late Joey Ramone. Hall is the father of two children.

Solo discography
2011 Walter MIDI Group "AND THEN YOU WOKE UP!"

Albums 
2014 Jiro Okabe "Return of the Kamikazi" (Mosrite Records)
2011 Walter MIDI Group "AND THEN YOU WOKE UP!" (Beautiful Dreamer Records)
1985: The Rattlers "Rattled" Jem Records (PVC Records)
1977 "Victoria Spivey and her Danny Boy" (Spivey LP 1023)
1970 "Spivey's Blues Cavalcade" (Spivey LP 1015)

Notes

References
 "I Slept with Joey Ramone: A Family Memoir" by Micky Leigh with Legs McNeil. Simon and Schuster Inc, 2009. page 191, 256, 273 and 400
 "I Know Better Now: My Life Before, During, and After the Ramones" by Richie Ramone with Peter Aaron Backbeat Books, 2018. page 209
 "Raisin' a Ruckus" by Rudi Protrudi Fanpro Books 2016

External links 
 http://www.robertchristgau.com/get_artist.php?name=rattlers
 http://www.markprindle.com/hall2-i.htm
 http://www.daveuhall.com
 http://www.waltermidigroup.com/
 http://maxskansascity.com/book/
 http://www.dionysusrecords.com/shop/index.php?_a=viewProd&productId=348
 http://alumni.berklee.edu/
 https://www.youtube.com/watch?v=SOTs-qWrPoo
 http://archives.wpkn.org/bookmarks/listen/270166/chris-frantz-labor-day-weekend-show
 https://www.youtube.com/watch?v=YB7bSEj_H3I

American bass guitarists
Living people
Year of birth missing (living people)
Guitarists from New York City
American male bass guitarists